alt.news 26:46 is a student-run television program from the College of Mass Communication & Media Arts at Southern Illinois University Carbondale that airs on the University's PBS member station, WSIU. This half hour magazine-style TV program has won national acclaim by capturing thirty-one regional and national awards including seven College Television Awards, or student Emmys. The "26:46" in the show's name reflect its general length per program—26 minutes, 46 seconds, with the remaining time in its half-hour slot used for WSIU's promos and messages.

History 
Alt.news began in 1995 when SIU alumni encouraged the school to expand its daily news program.  Students were asked to compete for several different weekly special segments, one of which was supposed to be an entertainment news segment.  This entertainment segment was morphed into a weekly news show called alt.news.  It featured a smart and wacky documentary style about everything and anything.  The average length was about seven minutes long and aired each Thursday night, quickly becoming the most controversial and anticipated news segment.  Alt.news continued in this format for three years until it was turned into the half hour show that it is today.

Filmography

External links 

alt.news Vimeo Page
alt.news YouTube
College of Mass Communication & Media Arts at SIUC
Department of Radio-Television at SIUC

See also
WSIU-TV
WIDB
New Media Center
College of Mass Communication & Media Arts
Southern Illinois University Carbondale

References

Local news programming in the United States
Student-produced television series
1999 American television series debuts
Southern Illinois University Carbondale